As of May 2005, this is a list of notable male middle distance runners (800 m – 3000 m) since the first Olympic Games in 1896.

This list includes any athlete who has been a medalist in the Olympic Games or World championships (indoor and outdoor). Also included are medalists in the IAAF World Cup and WAF events. Finally, it includes any athlete ranked (by time) in the top three of a middle-distance event for any given year since 1980.

A
 José Manuel Abascal, ESP
 Saïd Aouita, MAR
 Yevgeniy Arzhanov, URS (UKR)
 Jeff Atkinson, USA

B

 Mehdi Baala, FRA 
 Philip Baker, GBR 
 José Luiz Barbosa,  BRA
 Arturo Barrios, MEX
 Josy Barthel,  LUX
 Rachid El Basir, MAR
 Dieter Baumann, FRG
 Filbert Bayi, TAN
 Luigi Beccali, ITA
 Kenenisa Bekele, ETH
 Charles Bennett,  GBR
 Andrea Benvenuti, ITA
 Olaf Beyer, GDR
 Abdi Bile, SOM
 Jonah Birir, KEN
 Paul Bitok, KEN
 Arthur Blake, USA
 Mike Boit, KEN
 Yuriy Borzakovskiy, RUS
 Johan Botha, RSA
 Brahim Boutayeb, MAR
 Hammou Boutayeb, MAR
 Audun Boysen, NOR
 Hanns Braun, GER
 John Bray, USA
 Emil Breitkreutz, USA
 André Bucher, SUI
 Wilfred Bungei, KEN
 Andreas Busse, GDR
 Erik Byléhn, SWE

C
 Fermín Cacho, ESP
 Mateo Cañellas, ESP
 Abraham Chebii, KEN
 Joseph Chesire, KEN
 William Chirchir, KEN
 Sebastian Coe, GBR
 Eamonn Coghlan, IRL
 Jerry Cornes, GBR
 Tom Courtney, USA
 Steve Cram, GBR
 John Cregan, USA
 Bill Crothers, CAN
 Joaquim Cruz, BRA
 Glenn Cunningham, USA 
 Pawel Czapiewski, POL

D
 Nándor Dáni, HUN 
 Ira Davenport, USA
 John Davies, NZL
 Tomás de Teresa, ESP
 Ron Delany, IRL
 Pierre Délèze, SUI 
 Henri Deloge, FRA
 Rob Denmark, GBR
 Gennaro Di Napoli, ITA
 Andrés Manuel Díaz, ESP
 Rod Dixon, NZL
 Osmar dos Santos, BRA
 Ralph Doubell,  AUS
 Simon Doyle, AUS
 Rob Druppers, NED 
 Eric Dubus, FRA
 Giuseppe D'Urso, ITA

E
 Earl Eby, USA 
 Phil Edwards, CAN
 Hicham El Guerrouj, MAR
 Herb Elliott, AUS
 Peter Elliott, GBR
 Schuyler Enck, USA 
 Hermann Engelhard, GER
 Paul Ereng, KEN 
 Henry Eriksson, SWE
 Reyes Estévez, ESP
 Mark Everett, USA

F
 Joe Falcon,  USA 
 Tom Farrell,  USA
 Edwin Flack,  AUS
 Ray Flynn,  IRL
 Hauke Fuhlbrügge,  GDR

G
 José David Galván,  MEX
 Alberto García,  ESP
 Haile Gebrselassie,  ETH
 Markos Geneti, ETH
 Dimitrios Golemis,  GRE
 Benjamín González,  ESP
 José Luis González,  ESP
 Johnny Gray, USA
 Agberto Guimarães,  BRA

H
 Abdelkader Hachlaf,  MAR
 Mahjoub Haïda,  MAR
 David Hall, USA
 Norman Hallows,  GBR
 Wyndham Halswelle,  GBR
 Tommy Hampson, GBR 
 Marcel Hansenne,  FRA
 Arthémon Hatungimana,  BDI
 Lacey Hearn,  USA
 Kristian Hellström,  SWE
 Jens-Peter Herold,  GDR
 Ivan Heshko,  UKR
 Shazia Hidayat PAK
 Albert Hill,  GBR
 Michael Hillardt, AUS
 Simon Hoogewerf, CAN
 Harald Hudak, FRG

J
 Brahim Jabbour, MAR
 Arnold Jackson, GBR
 Michel Jazy, FRA
 Anacleto Jiménez, ESP
 Derek Johnson, GBR
 Earl Jones, USA
 Alberto Juantorena, CUB

K
 Yusuf Saad Kamel, BRN
 William Kemei, KEN
 Kip Keino, KEN
 Rich Kenah, USA
 George Kerr, JAM
 Omer Khalifa, SUD
 David Kibet, KEN
 John Kibowen, KEN
 Japheth Kimutai, KEN
 Alex Kipchirchir, KEN
 Eliud Kipchoge, KEN
 Wilson Kipketer, DEN
 Paul Kipkoech, KEN
 Stephen Kipkorir, KEN
 Luke Kipkosgei, KEN
 Nixon Kiprotich, KEN
 Wilson Kiprugut, KEN
 Moses Kiptanui, KEN
 Timothy Kiptanui, KEN
 Wilfred Kirochi, KEN
 Nikolay Kirov, URS (BLR)
 Abel Kiviat, USA
 Benson Koech, KEN
 Daniel Komen, KEN
 Billy Konchellah, KEN
 Patrick Konchellah, KEN
 Paul Korir, KEN
 Sammy Koskei, KEN
 David Krummenacker, USA
 Han Kulker, NED
 James Kwalia, KEN

L
 Jules Ladoumègue, FRA 
 Bernard Lagat, KEN
 Faouzi Lahbi, MAR
 John Landy, AUS
 Mario Lanzi, ITA
 Harri Larva, FIN
 Cyrille Laventure, FRA
 Serhiy Lebid, UKR
 António Leitão, POR
 Albin Lermusiaux, FRA
 James Lightbody, USA
 Benjamin Limo, KEN
 Jack Lovelock, NZL
 Douglas Lowe,  GBR
 Werner Lueg, GER (FRG) 
 Emilio Lunghi, ITA

M
 Driss Maazouzi,  FRA
 James Maina,  KEN
 Sydney Maree,  USA
 Paul Martin, SUI 
 John Mayock,  GBR
 John McGough,  GBR(IRL)
 Tom McKean,  GBR
 Bob McMillen,  USA
 Hailu Mekonnen,  ETH
 Ted Meredith,  USA
 Assefa Mezgebu,  ETH 
 Roger Moens,  BEL
 Enrique Molina,  ESP
 David Moorcroft, GBR
 Noureddine Morceli,  ALG
 Nico Motchebon, GER
 Craig Mottram, AUS
 Mohammed Mourhit, BEL
 Mbulaeni Mulaudzi, RSA 
 Joseph Mutua, KEN

N
 Patrick Ndururi, KEN 
 Jean-Patrick Nduwimana, BDI 
 Erik Nedeau, USA
 Noah Ngeny, KEN
 Vénuste Niyongabo, BDI
 Charles Nkazamyampi,  BDI
 Paavo Nurmi, FIN 
 Tom Nyariki, KEN

O
 Josef Odložil, CZE
 Frank O'Mara, IRL
 Yobes Ondieki, KEN
 Fred Onyancha, KEN
 Marcus O'Sullivan, IRL
 Steve Ovett, GBR

P
 Doug Padilla, USA
 Don Paige, USA
 Francesco Panetta, ITA
 Paul Pilgrim, USA
 Eino Purje, FIN

R
 Rashid Ramzi, BRN
 Gary Reed, CAN
 Antonio Manuel Reina, ESP
 Klaus Richtzenhain, GER (GDR) 
 James Robinson, USA
 Vebjørn Rodal, NOR
 Henry Rono, KEN
 Peter Rono, KEN
 Laban Rotich, KEN
 István Rózsavölgyi, HUN
 Bevil Rudd, SAF  
 Paul Ruto, KEN 
 Jim Ryun, USA

S
 Djabir Saïd-Guerni, ALG
 Wes Santee, USA
 Willy Schärer, SUI
 Nils Schumann, GER 
 Steve Scott, USA
 Hezekiél Sepeng, RSA
 Ismaïl Sghyr, MAR/FRA 
 David Sharpe, GBR
 Mel Sheppard, USA
 Larry Shields, USA
 Ali Saïdi Sief, ALG
 Mário Silva, POR 
 Rui Silva, POR
 Khalid Skah, MAR
 Willem Slijkhuis, NED 
 Peter Snell, NZL
 Bram Som, NED
 Boniface Songok, KEN 
 Jim Spivey, USA
 H. B. Stallard, GBR
 Martin Steele, GBR
 Rüdiger Stenzel, GER
 Lennart Strand, SWE
 David Strang, GBR
 Jürgen Straub, GDR
 Mohammed Sulaiman, QAT

T
 Norman Taber, USA
 William Tanui, KEN
 Norberto Téllez, CUB 
 Clive Terrelonge, JAM
 Colomán Trabado, ESP
 Bodo Tümmler, FRG
 Alfred Tysoe, GBR

U
 Heinz Ulzheimer, GER (FRG)

V
 Howard Valentine, USA
 Ivo Van Damme, BEL 
 Pekka Vasala, FIN
 Frank Verner, USA 
 Tonino Viali, ITA
 Isaac Viciosa, ESP

W
 Detlef Wagenknecht, GDR
 John Walker, NZL
 Alan Webb, USA
 Paul-Heinz Wellmann, FRG
 Mulugeta Wendimu, ETH 
 Thomas Wessinghage, FRG
 Anthony Whiteman, GBR
 Mal Whitfield, USA
 Alex Wilson, CAN
 Harold Wilson, GBR 
 Craig Winrow, GBR
 Arthur Wint, JAM
 Rick Wohlhuter, USA
 Million Wolde, ETH 
 John Woodruff, USA 
 Dave Wottle, USA 
 Willi Wülbeck, FRG
 William Wuycke, VEN

Y
 William Yiampoy, KEN

Z
 Branko Zorko, CRO

MIA

Athletes who medalled in a middle-distance event at both the European and Commonwealth Championships but did not meet the criteria to be listed above:

 Roger Bannister, GBR  
 Brendan Foster, GBR 
 Brian Hewson, GBR
 John Parlett, GBR 
 Mike Rawson, GBR  
 Sydney Wooderson, GBR

Other athletes who were ranked in the top three of 'Track and Field News' (TFN) end of year rankings for 800 m or 1500 m but have not already been listed above, are listed below.  Rankings have been done every year since 1947.

André De Hertoghe  BEL   – Andy Carter  GB   – Arnie Sowell  USA   – Ben Jipcho  KEN   – Dan Waern  SWE   – Danie Malan  SA   – David Mack  US   – Derek Ibbotson  GBR   – Dieter Fromm  EG   – Don Gehrmann  USA   – Doug Harris  NZ   – Dyrol Burleson  USA   – Francesco Arese  ITA   – Franz-Josef Kemper  WG   – Gaston Reiff  BEL   – Gösta Bergkvist  SWE   – Gunnar Nielsen  DEN   – Henry Szordykowski  POL   – Jean-Pierre Dufresne  FRA   – Jerry Siebert  USA   – Jim Baily  AUS   – Jim Beatty  USA   – Jim Dupree  FRA   – John Fulton  USA   – Jozef Plachy  CZE   – Jürgen May  EG   – Ken Swenson  USA   – Lajos Szentgáli  HUN   – László Tábori  HUN   – Manfred Matuschewski  EG   – Marcello Fiasconaro  ITA   – Marty Liquori  USA   – Merv Lincoln  AUS   – Murray Halberg  NZ   – Niels Hoslt-Sörensen  DEN   – Olle Åberg  SWE   – Patrick El Mabrouk  FRA   – Luciano Susanj  YUG   – Urban Cleve  WG   – Sándor Iharos  HUN   – Siegried Valentin  EG   – Stanislav Jungwirth  CZE   – Stefan Lewandowski  POL   – Wade Bell  USA   – Wes Santee  USA   – Wilfred Kirochi  KEN

Other Commonwealth Games medalists not already listed above:

Gerald Backhouse AUS   – Frank Handley ENG   – Alan Simpson ENG   – Albie Thomas AUS   – Ben Jipcho KEN   – Benedict Cayenne TRI   – Bill Dale CAN   – Bill Parnell CAN   – Brian Hewson ENG   – Chris McGeorge ENG   – Dave Campbell CAN   – Dick Quax NZL   – Willie Botha SAF   – Ian Boyd ENG   – Ian Studd NZL   – Jack Hutchins CAN   – James "Hamish" Stothard SCO   – Jim Alford WAL   – John Gladwin ENG   – John Kipkurgat KEN   – John Robson SCO   – Kevin Sullivan CAN   – Kris McCarthy AUS   – Len Eyre ENG   – Matthew Yates ENG   – Maurice Marshall NZL   – Merv Lincoln AUS   – Michael East ENG   – Noel Clough AUS   – Peter Bourke AUS   – Peter Lemashon KEN   – Peter O'Donoghue NZL/AUS   – Reg Thomas WAL   – Reuben Chesang KEN   – Rich Ferguson CAN   – Robert Ouko KEN   – Sammy Tirop KEN   – Savieri Ngidhi ZIM   – Seymour Newman JAM   – Terry Sullivan FRN   – Tony Blue AUS   – Vernon "Pat" Boot NZL   – William Smart CAN   – William Whyte AUS   – Youcef Abdi AUS

Other European Athletics Championships medalists not already listed above:

Bill Nankeville GBR   – Erik Jørgensen DEN   –  Frank Murphy IRL   – Hans-Peter Ferner FRG   – Harald Norpoth FRG   –  Jacques Lévèque FRA   – John Whetton GBR   – Jorma Härkönen FIN   – Joseph Mostert BEL   – Klaus-Peter Justus GDR   – Lucien De Muynck BEL   – Lukas Vydra CZE   – Markku Taskinen FIN   – Miklós Szabó HUN   –  Paul Schmidt FRG   – Piotr Piekarski POL   – Roger Normand FRA   – Rudolf Harbig GER   – Rune Gustafsson SWE   – Tom Birger Hansen DEN   – Tomá Salinger TCH   – Valeriy Bulyshev URS   – Witold Baran POL  – Marcin Lewandowski  POL  – Michael Rimmer  GBR  – Adam Kszczot  POL

See also
 

Runners, Middle-distance
 
Runners, Middle-distance